Rhoads Homestead is a historic homestead located at New Hope, Bucks County, Pennsylvania. The farmhouse consists of two sections; the oldest built about 1734. The first section is a -story fieldstone structure with a 1-story, sloped roof fieldstone addition attached. A second house dates to 1760, and is a -story, fieldstone dwelling remodeled in the 19th century in the Victorian style.  It has a 2-story stone addition and a 1-story board-and-batten addition.  Associated with this house are stone spring houses, board-and-batten wood sheds, a clapboard pump shelter, and the ruins of a small bank barn.  The third house was built in 1858, and is a small -story, board-and-batten dwelling built to house servants.  The homestead was the site of General William Alexander's three week bivouac prior to the Battle of Trenton from December 8 through December 25, 1776.

It was added to the National Register of Historic Places in 1983.

Gallery

References

Houses on the National Register of Historic Places in Pennsylvania
Houses completed in 1734
Houses in Bucks County, Pennsylvania
National Register of Historic Places in Bucks County, Pennsylvania